Saint Nicholas Church is a Romanian Orthodox church in Brașov, dominating the historic district of Șcheii Brașovului.

History
The church was established in 1292. It was mentioned in a Papal bull issued in 1399 by Pope Boniface IX. Starting in 1495, the church was rebuilt in stone by the locals, with help from Vlad Călugărul, Voivode (Prince) of Wallachia.  More help was provided around 1512 by Neagoe Basarab.

Saint Nicholas Church was initially built in the Gothic style; it was later redecorated with Baroque style architectural elements. The interior has frescoes painted by the renowned muralist Mișu Popp.

Historic district
Located within the churchyard walls there are:
St. Nicholas Cemetery, where Ioan Meșotă, Aurel Popovici, Vasile Saftu, and Nicolae Titulescu are buried.
Statue of Coresi.
Adjacent in the Șchei historic district there is: 
The First Romanian School, started in 1583.

External links

 

14th-century Eastern Orthodox church buildings
Churches completed in 1512
Romanian Orthodox churches in Brașov County
Religious buildings and structures in Brașov
Tourist attractions in Brașov
Gothic architecture in Romania
1292 establishments in Romania